Leader of the Opposition in the Senate may refer to:

 Leader of the Opposition in the Senate (Australia)
 Leader of the Opposition in the Senate (Canada)
 Leader of the Opposition in the French Senate